Elspeth Hanson (born 12 May 1986) is the violist of the all female string quartet, Bond.

Biography 
Hanson was born in London and was educated at Theale Green Community School and the School of St Helen and St Katharine in Abingdon, Oxfordshire.  She started learning the violin aged 12 and at 16 won a place as first violin with the National Youth Orchestra of Great Britain with whom she has toured the UK and played live at the BBC Proms.

Previously she had recorded solos with the London Symphony Orchestra, The Royal Liverpool Philharmonic and the City of Prague Philharmonia. Elspeth is studying towards a Masters at the Royal Academy of Music with Richard Deakin.

She played and sang at The Southbank for Oxfam Aid.  She gave a solo performance of Vivaldi's "Four Seasons" at the Birmingham Symphony Hall in July 2005 in the National Festival of Music for Youth and has performed solo fiddle live on radio at Celtic Connections in Glasgow and at the Millennium Dome. She is an ambassador for Wooden Spoon, a volunteer for South African foundation 'GGA' God's Golden Acre based in Kwazulu-Natal. Elspeth played solo in BBC's live Christmas broadcast The Liverpool Nativity, and works alongside Philip Sheppard.

2008 – present 

Hanson replaced original member Haylie Ecker in 2008, when she left to have a child. Hanson had previously appeared at the 2008 Summer Olympics Closing Ceremony alongside Jimmy Page, Leona Lewis and David Beckham during the London 2012 handover. Around that time she also played at the Paralympics Closing Ceremony.

In 2009 Peugeot commissioned Bond to record Vivaldi's "Four Seasons" to advertise the 308CC. These were among Hanson's first appearances with the Quartet.

References

External links
 Bond Official Website
 Elspeth Hanson on Myspace

English classical cellists
Living people
Bond (band) members
1986 births
People from Basildon, Berkshire
People educated at the School of St Helen and St Katharine